Herbert Pankau (born 4 October 1941) is a German former footballer.

The midfielder won 23 caps for East Germany between 1962 and 1967.

In the East German top-flight Pankau scored 30 goals in 257 matches.

Career statistics

Club

International
.

International goals
Scores and results list East Germany's goal tally first.

References

External links
 
 
 
 

1941 births
Living people
People from Złotów County
People from the Province of Pomerania
Sportspeople from Greater Poland Voivodeship
German footballers
East German footballers
East Germany international footballers
Association football midfielders
Olympic footballers of the United Team of Germany
Olympic bronze medalists for the United Team of Germany
Olympic medalists in football
Footballers at the 1964 Summer Olympics
Medalists at the 1964 Summer Olympics
FC Hansa Rostock players
DDR-Oberliga players